Noen Sa-nga is a district (amphoe) of Chaiyaphum province, northeastern Thailand.

History
The government separated Tambon Nong Chim, Ta Noen, and Kahad of Chatturat district to create the minor district (king amphoe) Noen Sa-nga on 1 April 1992. It was upgraded to a full district on 11 October 1997.

Geography
Neighboring districts are (from the east clockwise): Ban Lueam, Khong, and Phra Thong Kham of Nakhon Ratchasima province; Chatturat, Ban Khwao, and Mueang Chaiyaphum of Chaiyaphum Province.

Administration
The district is divided into four subdistricts (tambons), which are further subdivided into 48 villages (mubans). There are no municipal (thesaban) areas. There are four tambon administrative organizations.

References

External links
amphoe.com

Noen Sa-nga